Wet'n'Wild Las Vegas was a water park in Spring Valley, Nevada. The park was part of Village Roadshow Theme Parks' Wet'n'Wild chain of water parks located across the world. The park opened in May 2013 and is located at 7055 S. Fort Apache Road, southwest of the I-215 and Sunset Road interchange.  The water park reopened June 22, 2020 with enhanced COVID-19 safety protocols. The Park was purchased by Cowabunga Bay in March 2022, re-branded as Cowabunga Canyon

History
On August 6, 2011, plans to develop a  water park in the Las Vegas Valley were unveiled. The owners of the Hawaiian Falls chain of water parks in Texas were behind the proposal to open the park by Memorial Day Weekend 2012. On November 14, 2011, Splash Canyon Waterpark was officially announced along with a listing of the rides and attractions to be included in the park. On February 3, 2012, it was announced that the opening of the water park would be delayed by a year.

In June 2012, Australian-based entertainment company Village Roadshow revealed they had plans to open a Wet'n'Wild-branded water park in Las Vegas. The company already operated Wet'n'Wild Hawaii and Wet'n'Wild Phoenix in the United States, as well as amusement and water parks in Australia including Wet'n'Wild Gold Coast. On October 4, 2012, it was announced that Village Roadshow Theme Parks would be opening Wet'n'Wild Las Vegas in May 2013 on the site of the proposed Splash Canyon Waterpark. Village Roadshow held a 51% stake in the park with private investors including Andre Agassi and Steffi Graf holding the remaining 49%. The  water park cost over US$50 million.

In mid-May 2013, Wet'n'Wild Las Vegas announced the park's opening and operating schedule, as well as a charity auction for the first rides on four of the park's slides. Due to the popularity of the park, Wet'n'Wild Las Vegas' opening was staggered for different ticket holders. Following a private grand opening party on May 23, the park opened to Gold Pass holders on May 25, Season Pass holders on May 28, and all other ticket holders on June 3.

Demand for season passes caused the park to cease selling passes for the year, and pushed expansion of the park forward to the immediate end of the season, as Village Roadshow owned 71 acres around the park for future expansion.

A 2019 high school "neon night" was marred by multiple fights requiring police intervention and an early closure of the park.

Due to the COVID-19 pandemic, Wet'n'Wild Las Vegas did not open in spring 2020.  Even after legal restrictions were removed, Wet'n'Wild Las Vegas remained closed.

In March 2022, the Wet'n'Wild property was sold and re-branded as Cowabunga Canyon Waterpark, which joined into partnership with Cowabunga Bay Waterpark, known as Cowabunga Vegas. Season passes are shared between the two parks. Cowabunga Canyon opened in May 2022.

Attractions
Wet'n'Wild Las Vegas features 26 attractions including:
 Canyon Cliffs – two speed slides 
 Colorado Cooler – a  lazy river
 Constrictor – a multi-person raft ride featuring corkscrew turns and speeds of up to 
 Desert Racers – a  multi-lane racer water slide with 6 lanes
 Hoover Half Pipe – a WhiteWater West Boomerango water slide
 Rattler – a WhiteWater West Rattler water slide
 Royal Flush Extreme – a WhiteWater West bowl water slide
 Splash Island – a WhiteWater West AquaPlay area which features a variety of slides as well as a  tipping bucket
 The Wave Pool – a  wave pool capable of producing  waves
 Zipp, Zapp, and Zoom – a series of inline tube slides
  Tornado – A slide that "simulates a natural storm experience" including weightlessness

References

External links
 
 

2013 establishments in Nevada
Village Roadshow Theme Parks
Water parks in Nevada
Buildings and structures in Spring Valley, Nevada
Tourist attractions in the Las Vegas Valley